The OCA–DLR Asteroid Survey (ODAS) was an astronomical survey to search for small Solar System bodies focusing on near-Earth objects in the late 1990s. This European scientific project was a collaboration between the French Observatoire de la Côte d'Azur (OCA) and the German Aerospace Center (DLR). The survey is credited for the discovery of one comet and more than 1000 minor planets during 1996–1999.

Description 

ODAS operated in cooperation with a global effort regarding near-Earth objects that was begun by the "Working Group on Near-Earth Objects", a component of the International Astronomical Union. The project began October 1996 and ceased observations in April 1999 for a refurbishing. However the telescope has not been reopened since that time. Survey observations were made during the 15 days each month when moon light was at a minimum, during the first and last quarters of the lunar month. The operation used a 90 cm Schmidt telescope of the OCA at Calern, near the city of Nice in southeastern France. A combination of a CCD camera and a software package were used for automated detection of moving objects.

Throughout its tenure, the project observed a total of 10,523 objects, made a total of 44,433 positional measurements, and was responsible for the discovery of more than a thousand asteroids according to the new rules issued by the MPC in October 2010. (The rules redefines who discovered a particular object. Previously, ODAS accounted for a total of 1020 asteroid discoveries). Among the discoveries are also 5 near-Earth asteroids and 8 Mars-crossers (without considering said rule). ODAS also recovered several objects that were previously lost and discovered the comet 198P/ODAS The discovered NEO's were 189011 Ogmios,  (recovery), 16912 Rhiannon, 1998 SJ2, and 1998 VD31.

List of discovered minor planets 

ODAS is credited by the Minor Planet Center (MPC) with the discovery of more than a thousand numbered minior planets during 1996–1999. The published list on ODAS project website may significantly differ from the MPC, as newly numbered bodies have been added, while other bodies are not (anymore) credited to ODAS.

See also 
 
 Spaceguard
 List of near-Earth object observation projects

References 
 

Astronomical surveys
Asteroid surveys